Ghatail Union is a union of Ghatail Upazila, Tangail District, Bangladesh. It is situated 32 km north of Tangail, The District Headquarter.

Demographics
According to the 2011 Bangladesh census, Ghatail Union had 4,910 households and a population of 19,897.

The literacy rate (age 7 and over) was 51% (Male-54.2%, Female-47.8%).

See also
 Union Councils of Tangail District

References

Populated places in Dhaka Division
Populated places in Tangail District
Unions of Ghatail Upazila